Allan Charleston (10 February 1934 – 24 March 2015) was an Australian water polo player. He competed in the men's tournament at the 1960 Summer Olympics. In 2012, he was inducted into the Water Polo Australia Hall of Fame.

References

External links
 

1934 births
2015 deaths
Australian male water polo players
Olympic water polo players of Australia
Water polo players at the 1960 Summer Olympics
Sportspeople from Fremantle